Tout ce qui brille is a 2010 French film and the debut feature film for Géraldine Nakache and Hervé Mimran, who co-wrote and co-directed the film. It was filmed in Puteaux, La Défense, and Paris, notably the 16th arrondissement.

Originally, Tout ce qui brille was a 2007 short film shot by the same directors.

Plot
Ely (Géraldine Nakache) and Lila (Leïla Bekhti) are two working class girls and best friends who dream of a glitzier, more glamorous lifestyle. They sneak into a nightclub where they meet Agathe (Virginie Ledoyen) and Joan (Linh Dan Pham) a rich, lesbian couple who give them a ride home. Lila, wanting to appear to be at the same social level as the girls, lies about where she and Ely live, giving the couple the address of a nice building in a wealthy neighborhood.

Lila continues to lie herself into the life of Agathe and Joan, and her new boyfriend Maxx (Simon Buret), while Ely feels more and more left out as she realizes that Lila is spending all her time partying with her new crowd, having been accepted as one of them, while Ely is nothing to Agathe and Joan but an inexpensive babysitter for their son. Eventually she grows sick of Lila's lies and reveals their true identity to Maxx. Lila, terrified at the thought of being rejected by her new friends, becomes furious at Ely. The two girls argue and stop talking. As Lila's lies begin to crumble around her, she realizes that Agathe and her social circle are not really her friends and that by working hard Ely is slowly achieving what she dreamed of. She gets a real job working at an upscale shoe store and eventually succeeds in reconnecting with Ely.

Cast
 Géraldine Nakache as Ely Wapler
 Leïla Bekhti as Lila Belaifa
 Virginie Ledoyen as Agathe
 Linh Dan Pham as Joan, Agathe's partner
 Audrey Lamy as Carole, Ely and Lila's friend
 Manu Payet as Éric, Lila's fiancé 
 Simon Buret as Maxx, 
 Daniel Cohen as Maurice, Ely's father
 Nanou Garcia as Danielle, Ely's mother
 Ary Abittan as Lila's father
 Sabrina Ouazani as Sandra, Lila's colleague
 Fejria Deliba as Nadia, Lila's mother
 Lucie Bourdeu as Annah, Ely's younger sister
 Nader Boussandel as Slim, Ely's neighbor
 Jeanne Ferron as Mme Houbloup, gossip lady in the building
 Alexandre Gars as Elvis, Agathe's son
 Maria Ducceshi as Jil

Awards and nominations

Awards won
2010: Special jury award and European Public Award at Festival international du film de comédie de l'Alpe d'Huez 
2011: Best Feminin Hope of the Year (newcomer) for Leïla Bekhti at 36th César Awards 
2011: Étoiles d'or du cinéma français (Gold Star of French Cinema) for:
Best Debut Film for Géraldine Nakache and Hervé Mimran 
Feminin Revelation of the Year for Leïla Bekhti

Nominations
2011: César for Best Debut Film for Géraldine Nakache et Hervé Mimran at 36th César Awards
2011: César for Best Femini Hope (newcomer) for Audrey Lamy

Soundtrack
The soundtrack of the film has proven popular particularly the song "Chanson sur une drôle de vie" sung by appearing in SNEP official French Singles Chart. It is a remake of a previous Véronique Sanson hit. The soundtrack also featured the song Fit But You Know It by The Streets.

References

External links
Official website

2010 films
2010s French-language films
Features based on short films
2010 comedy films
French comedy films
Pathé films
Films directed by Géraldine Nakache
2010 directorial debut films
2010s French films